Lake Jefferson is a lake in Le Sueur County, Minnesota. Fish species enzootic to Lake Jefferson include bluegill, largemouth bass, northern pike, and walleye. While the Geographic Names Information System considers Lake Jefferson to be a single lake, it is sometimes referred to as two lakes, East Jefferson Lake and West Jefferson Lake. There are four sections: lower Jefferson, middle Jefferson, upper Jefferson, and Swedes Bay. The lake drains to German Lake through a connecting culvert, and is part of the Cannon River watershed.

The lake was named for Thomas Jefferson, the third President of the United States.

References

External links
East Jefferson Lake at Lake-Link.com
West Jefferson Lake at Lake-Link.com
Lake information reports for East Jefferson, Middle Jefferson, and West Jefferson lakes from Minnesota Department of Natural Resources.
Cannon River Watershed Minnesota PCA

Lakes of Minnesota
Lakes of Le Sueur County, Minnesota